Viktor Klima (born 4 June 1947) is an Austrian Social Democrat politician and businessman. He was chancellor of Austria from 1997 to 2000.

Early career

Born in Schwechat, Lower Austria, Klima started working for the then state-owned OMV oil company in 1969 and remained with the company up to the beginning of his political career in 1992, in his later years serving as a member of their management board.

Minister

Although Klima was then unknown to the majority of Austrians, in 1992 Chancellor Franz Vranitzky made him Minister of Transportation and Nationalised Industry, a position Klima held till 1996, when he became Finance Minister for a year.

Chancellor of Austria

In 1997, upon Vranitzky's resignation, Klima was elected chairman of the Social Democratic party and was sworn in as Chancellor of Austria, having renewed the grand coalition between his own party (Social Democratic Party of Austria, SPÖ) and the Austrian People's Party (ÖVP), with Wolfgang Schüssel serving as his vice chancellor.

Influenced by the "Third Way" strategy of other European leaders such as Tony Blair and Gerhard Schröder, under Klima's chairmanship the Social Democrats played down their allegiance to Marxism and thus to their own political roots and very clearly continued their move from the political left towards the centre, frequently using spin doctors and embracing populism as a political strategy.

For example, further privatizations took place, and several public services that had been subsumed under the policies of the welfare state were tentatively reduced. As a consequence, a high percentage of the party's traditional working-class constituency, dissatisfied with Klima and his party, redirected their support to Jörg Haider's populist far-right Freedom Party (FPÖ). However, just as his predecessor Vranitzky, Klima repeatedly and publicly announced that under no circumstances was he prepared to enter into a coalition with Haider's party.

Following the elections of October 1999, in which the Social Democrats sustained heavy losses, Viktor Klima stepped down as the chairman of his party and was succeeded in this capacity by Alfred Gusenbauer. As chancellor he was succeeded by Wolfgang Schüssel from the Austrian People's Party, who formed a coalition government with the Freedom Party in February 2000.

Klima and his party heavily resented the fact that they were removed from rulership. While negotiations to form a new government on the basis of the October 1999 elections were ongoing, Klima "urged fellow EU leaders to help influence the coalition bargaining," an unprecedented call for foreign interference in the political affairs of the sovereign Austrian state whose acting chancellor he still was at the time of this statement. While this failed to influence the outcome of the coalition talks, it led directly to the so-called "sanctions" against Austria, which had no basis whatsoever in the EU charter.

Business career
A few weeks later, with the help of his friend Gerhard Schröder, Klima took up a senior management position with Volkswagen in Argentina at a time when the country was in a deep economic crisis. Klima became General Manager of Volkswagen's entire South American operations in mid-2006, and was under contract until 2011. Klima's background in politics as well as in economy predestines him for networking, a capability he has continued to cultivate on the highest level, such as with Argentina's former president, Néstor Kirchner and his predecessor, Eduardo Duhalde. Klima retired in 2011 and lives on a cattle farm near Buenos Aires.

References

 "Austria." Britannica Book of the Year, 2001. Encyclopædia Britannica Online. Encyclopædia Britannica, 2010. Web. 22 January 2010
 "Klima, Viktor (1947-)." Encyclopedia of World Biography. Thomson Gale, 1998

1947 births
Living people
20th-century Chancellors of Austria
Social Democratic Party of Austria politicians
Austrian people of Czech descent
Chancellors of Austria
Finance Ministers of Austria
People from Schwechat